The Yaesu FT-891 is a HF + 6 meters all mode mobile amateur radio transceiver. The FT-891 was first announced to the public by Yaesu at the 2016 Dayton Hamvention. The radio has 100 watts output on CW, SSB, and FM modulations and 25 watts of output in AM. As a mobile transceiver the FT-891 is well suited for mobile installation in vehicles, and weighing less than 5 pounds it is often used for field activations such as Summits on the Air, and Parks on the Air. The radio has been praised for its noise reduction and sensitive receiver. Common criticisms of the radio include it's many menus that are difficult to navigate with its small screen, the lack of VHF/UHF capabilities, and lack of an internal antenna tuner. Although the radio lacks an internal sound card it still has input and output jacks for audio and be controlled over a USB cable allowing the radio to use digital modes such as WinLink, PSK31 and FT8.

Specifications 

 Frequency range: Tx: 1.8 – 54 MHz (Amateur Bands Only) Rx: 30 kHz – 56 MHz
 Modes of emission: A1A (CW), A3E (AM), J3E (LSB, USB), F3E (FM)
 Impedance: 50 Ohms, unbalanced
 Supply voltage: 13.8 VDC +/- 15%, negative ground
 Current consumption: Rx: 2.0 A Tx: 23 A
 Case size (WxHxD): 6.1” x 2.0” x 8.6” (155 x 52 x 218 mm) w/o knobs
 Weight (approx.): 4.18 lb (1.9 kg)
 Output power: 100W (adjustable 5–100 watts) SSB/CW/FM (AM: 25W – adjustable 5–25 watts)
 Circuit type: SSB/CW/AM: triple-conversion superheterodyne FM: double conversion superheterodyne

External links 

 Official Yaesu website
 Yaesu FT-891 website

References 

Amateur radio transceivers